KNDRGRTN is an American alternative hip-hop artiste.

Career 
KNDRGRTN paused his studies at the University of Michigan to pursue music which he claimed had been of interest to him since high school. He draws inspiration 90s acts like from Kurt Cobain, Sex Pistols, The Rolling Stones, Nirvana.

Discography 

 Insert here, EP, 2018
 "City of Angels", Single,  2019
 "Blue and Grey", Single, 2020
 Sleeping with my clothes on., EP, 2020

References 

Year of birth missing (living people)
Living people
Alternative hip hop musicians
University of Michigan alumni